The Madhav, Govind, Rameshwar Temple is located at Agapur (Agasthipur) village, in Ponda taluk, Goa State, India. It is Trikutachala shrine, and the Temple is devoted to the Vaishnavite deities Madhav (Krishna), Rameshwar and Shaiv deity Rameshwar.

References

Bibliography
Essays In Goan History, edited by Teotónio R. de Souza, Concept Publishing Company

Hindu temples in South Goa district